Sidearm, side-arm or Side Arm(s) may refer to:

Sidearm (weapon), a backup weapon
Sidearm (baseball), a baseball throwing technique
Sidearm, a flying disc (Frisbee) throw
Side Arms Hyper Dyne, a 1986 arcade game
AGM-122 Sidearm, a missile
Side-arm flask (Büchner flask), a type of laboratory glassware